The following is an outline of 1981 in spaceflight.

Launches

|colspan="8"|

January 
|-

|colspan="8"|

February 

|-

|colspan="8"|

March 

|-

|colspan="8"|

April 

|-

|colspan="8"|

May 

|-

|colspan="8"|

June 

|-

|colspan="8"|

July 

|-

|colspan="8"|

August 

|-

|colspan="8"|

September 

|-

|colspan="8"|

October 

|-

|colspan="8"|

November 

|-

|colspan="8"|

December 

|-

|}

Deep-space rendezvous

References

Footnotes

 
Spaceflight by year